Huey P. Long House may refer to:

Huey P. Long Mansion, in New Orleans, listed on the NRHP in Orleans Parish, Louisiana
Huey P. Long House (Forest Ave., Shreveport, Louisiana) at 305 Forest Ave., listed on the NRHP in Caddo Parish, Louisiana
Huey P. Long House (Laurel St., Shreveport, Louisiana) at 2403 Laurel St., formerly listed on the NRHP in Caddo Parish, Louisiana